Gleb Koryagin (born August 6, 1994) is a Russian professional ice hockey player. He is currently playing for Amur Khabarovsk of the Kontinental Hockey League (KHL).

Playing career
He first made his professional debut with Dynamo Moscow in the 2013–14 season. Koryagin returned to Dynamo for a second stint on July 19, 2017, after spending the duration of the 2016–17 season with HC Lada Togliatti.

Koryagin registered 4 assists in 46 regular season games with Dynamo in the 2017–18 season, before leaving as a free agent and signing a one-year deal with Amur Khabarovsk on September 1, 2018.

References

External links 

1994 births
Living people
Amur Khabarovsk players
HC Dynamo Moscow players
HC Lada Togliatti players
Russian ice hockey defencemen